Woman at the Café is a 1931 painting by the Italian artist Antonio Donghi. It depicts a lone woman at a café table.

It is painted with oil on canvas and has the dimensions 80 × 60 centimeters. It belongs to the Fondazione Musei Civici di Venezia. It is on view at the Ca' Pesaro's Modern Art Museum in Venice.

Reception
Cipriano Efisio Oppo called the painting "clean as a copper pot in a kitchen". Alberto Francini of L'Italia Letteraria wrote about the scene: "And do not let the lone, bare table in a seaside Trattoria in Ostia deceive you. There is no tragedy. There will soon be a steaming bowl of fragrant fish soup [on it]. The Woman at the Café will have her ice cream, and the Young Girl will find a husband."

See also
 Post-expressionism

References

1931 paintings
Italian paintings
Paintings in Venice